Bhairavi Raichura is an Indian television actress. She is best known for playing Kaajal Mathur in Hum Paanch, and Rajni Kashyap in Sasural Genda Phool and Bhagwati Singh in Balika Vadhu.

In 1996, she worked opposite Shekhar Suman in the romantic series Ek Raja Ek Rani, playing the role of a simple girl, who falls in love with a wealthy millionaire, who loves her unconditionally.

Television

Awards

References

External links

Living people
Indian television actresses
Indian soap opera actresses
Actresses in Hindi television
Place of birth missing (living people)
Year of birth missing (living people)
Gujarati people
20th-century Indian actresses
21st-century Indian actresses